Tenzin Phuntsok Rinpoche (born October 28, 2002), also called Tenzin Nyudrup, is the recognised reincarnation of the Tibetan Mahasiddha Geshe Lama Konchog, who died in 2001.

His early life and discovery as a reincarnated lama is documented in the 2008 English-language documentary film, Unmistaken Child.

References

External links
Geshe Lama Konchok biography at Kopan Monastery website
Geshe Lama Konchog at PhuntsokRinpoche.com Blog
Phuntsok Rinpoche (confirmed reincarnation of Geshe Lama Konchog)

Gelug Lamas
Lamas from Tibet
Mahayana Buddhists
Mahasiddhas